Southend Stadium was a former greyhound racing and football stadium in Grainger Road, Southend-on-Sea, Essex. It was also the home ground of Southend United between 1934 and 1955 and was also known as Greyhound Park.

Origins
The first greyhound racing in Southend took place at the Kursaal from 1927 until 1929. Three years later in 1932 planning permission for a new stadium was submitted to the Southend Council by a new company called Southend Stadium Ltd headed by the Wimbledon supremo William John Cearns.

The new stadium was built on the site of the Milton Hall Brickworks in the All Saints Ward and featured two main stands, the east stand which would later have a restaurant and the west stand with covered seating, the remainder of the stadium being uncovered terracing. The Milton Hall Brick Company Ltd had just opened the Star Lane Brickworks in the nearby village of Great Wakering allowing the sale of the older Brickworks located between the Redstock Road to the north, Maldon Road to the south and Sutton Road on its east side. After the stadium had been constructed it could be accessed from the new Stadium Road via Redstock Road or from Grainger Road via Maldon Road.

Opening
The stadium opened on Saturday 15 April 1933 and attracted an attendance of over 5,000. The first ever race was won by a greyhound called Janet McNab over 525 yards, the greyhound won by 5 lengths in a time of 32.22 secs.

Pre war history
Meetings took place on Monday afternoon in addition to Wednesday and Friday evening. Distances used in the early years of racing were 300, 500 and 525 yards including hurdles. The Thames Silver Salver was inaugurated in 1933 and became an established competition that would attract some of the sports best sprinters in future years.

In 1934 Southend United F.C. relocated the club from the Kursaal to the Southend Stadium in a complete reversal of proceedings that had taken place in 1927. A seven-year lease had been agreed despite reservations from the Football Association. The Racing Manager was T F Fenton-Livingstone and the timekeeper was Les Cox who would later become Racing Manager at Romford Greyhound Stadium.

The circuit was 465 yards in circumference and was described as a particularly easy galloping track with good straights which gradually merge into the banked bends. The hare system was an 'Outside Sumner' and the racing kennels were located behind the east stand that now included a restaurant and the Greycing Club with dance floor. Below the east stand Greycing Club was the Junior Greycing Club and cheaper enclosure. The residential kennels were to
be found seven miles away in the village of Canewdon.

Some of the earliest trainers at the track included J Bartlett, Stan Gray, A.F Dandridge and Frank Clarke, the latter left the stadium in 1937 to be replaced by Bill Cowell. Cowell won the Scurry Gold Cup and Lincoln Stakes with Hexham Bridge in 1937 whilst Stan Gray trained Happy Squire an Essex Vase success in 1939. Jim Syder Jr. trained at the track for eleven years from 1935 to 1946 before joining Wembley Greyhounds.

Post war history

The vast majority of tracks continued to trade throughout the war but Southend had been requisitioned by the Army Officer Training Corps in 1940 leaving the football team and greyhound racing without a home.

When hostilities ceased in 1945 the stadium was in need of major repairs and the pitch had to be re-laid before the football team could play again. Greyhound racing returned during April 1946. The totalisator peaked in 1948 at £1,694,181 during a boom period for the industry.

A rival track called the Rayleigh Weir Stadium opened in 1948. Mr A Gray became Racing Manager and in 1955 the football team decided not to renew the lease and left for Roots Hall. Trainer Bill Matthews won the Thames Silver Salver for his home track in 1955.

The 1960s saw racing held three times a week racing on Monday, Thursday and Saturday and the stadium regularly closed from January to March. The hare system changed to an 'Outside McKee'. There were five buffet bars and two licensed bars listed in the facilities during a time when Arthur Hall became General Manager and Terry Evans replaced A Gray as Racing Manager.

In the late 1960s and early 1970s the trainers were Stan Gray, Dennis Mansfield, Bill Matthews and Bert Stephens, Kenny Linzell had a spell at track as well. In August 1970 the BBC screened the annual Television Trophy at the track; it was the first time that colour was used. A new stand was constructed with a new tiered restaurant which brought increased attendances and tote turnover but proposals for a new track to be laid inside the greyhound track for speedway and stock cars was refused by the council over noise concerns.

Stan Gray retired in 1971 replaced by Tony Barker and new trainer Tom Lanceman who also supplied runners to Ipswich Stadium was one of the first trainers to take dual attachment. In 1979 Lanceman's Topofthetide won the Grand National for the second successive year. The stadium introduced the Coronation Cup in 1981 and Tony Dennis won the Grand Prix with Rathduff Solara.

Closure
The last meeting was held on Boxing Day 1985. Two months later the stands and terracing were demolished making way for a retail park.

Competitions
Thames Silver Salver
Coronation Cup

Track records
Pre-metric
		
Post-metric

References

Defunct greyhound racing venues in the United Kingdom
Defunct sports venues in Essex
Southend United F.C.
Defunct football venues in England
Sports venues completed in 1933
English Football League venues
1985 disestablishments in England
Sports venues demolished in 1986
1933 establishments in England